Leonardstatuetten (Leonard Statuette) is a prize awarded by the Norwegian Comedy Writers' Association. The award is named after revue instructor, composer and director Einar Leonard Schanke  (1927–1992), who was one of Norway's most important revue personalities. The prize is regarded the highest distinction in Norwegian revue. Awarded from 1968 to 2013, the statuette was given to persons with a significant and lasting importance to Norway's entertainment industry. The statuette was again awarded in 2019, when Eldar Vågan was the recipient.

Prize winners

This is a list of prize winners:
1968 – Arvid Nilssen, actor       
1969 – Leif Juster, actor
1970 – not awarded                       
1971 – Kari Diesen, actress  		
1972 – Arve Opsahl, actor        
1973 – Bias Bernhoft, revue writer	        
1974 – Jens Book-Jenssen, actor   
1975 – Carsten Byhring, actor	
1976 – Rolf Just Nilsen, actor 
1977 – Einar Schanke, instructor and composer   
1978 – Rolv Wesenlund, actor	 
1979 – Otto Nielsen, revue writer		
1980 – Arild Feldborg, revue writer 	 
1981 – Alfred Næss, revue writer	         
1982 – Knut Solberg, scenographer          
1983 – Elsa Lystad, actress
1984 – Harald Heide-Steen Jr., actor  
1985 – Arild Haga, revue writer
1986 – Elisabeth Granneman, actress 
1987 – Sølvi Wang, actress
1988 – not awarded
1989 – not awarded
1990 – Yngvar Numme, actor 
1991 – Grethe Kausland, actress     
1992 – not awarded
1993 – Dizzie Tunes: Tor Erik Gunstrøm, Svein-Helge Høgberg, Einar Idland, Øyvind Klingberg, Yngvar Numme, actors 
1994 – Bjørn Sand, revue writer              
1995 – Erik Diesen, revue writer       
1996 – not awarded
1997 – Øystein Sunde, artist/composer/text writer
1998 – Hege Schøyen and Øivind Blunck, actors
1999 – Arthur Arntzen, humorist and satirist 
2000 – Dag Frøland, actor       
2001 – KLM (Trond Kirkvaag, Knut Lystad, Lars Mjøen, actors)
2002 – Odd Børretzen, humorist and satirist       
2003 – Brit Elisabeth Haagensli, actor     
2004 – not awarded             
2005 – Andreas Diesen, revue historian   
2006 - not awarded
2007 - Jon Skolmen, actor 
2008 - Jakob Margido Esp, actor and humorist 
2009 – not awarded
2010 – Rune Gokstad and Øystein Bache
2011 – not awarded
2012 – Linn Skåber
2013 – Ingrid Bjørnov
2014 to 2018 – not awarded
2019 – Eldar Vågan

References 

Norwegian theatre awards
Norwegian awards
Awards established in 1968
 
1968 establishments in Norway